Kevin Walker (born December 24, 1965) who went to West Milford High School in West Milford, New Jersey is a former American football linebacker for the Cincinnati Bengals of the National Football League (NFL). Walker is most notable for making the tackle that ultimately ended the career of Bo Jackson.

Professional career
Walker was a 3rd round draft choice of the Cincinnati Bengals out of the University of Maryland in the 1988 NFL Draft.  Walker was a regular throughout the 1989 and 1990 seasons and was a part of the Cincinnati Bengals team that reached Super Bowl XXIII.  During the 1990 playoffs, Walker made a routine tackle on Los Angeles Raiders star running back Bo Jackson that caused a serious hip injury that ended Jackson's football career.

Walker's career came to an end with an injury of his own torn knee ligament during a game against the Seattle Seahawks.  Walker had previously injured a knee during the 1988 season.

References

External links
 Bengals feature on Walker
 NY Times report of Walker's injury

1965 births
Living people
American football linebackers
Cincinnati Bengals players
Maryland Terrapins football players
People from Denville, New Jersey
People from West Milford, New Jersey
Players of American football from New Jersey
Ed Block Courage Award recipients